The Jajangmyeon Museum is a museum in Jung District, Incheon, South Korea about Jajangmyeon noodle.

History
The museum was opened on 28 April 2012.

Architecture
The museum consist of six exhibition halls:
 History of Chinese Immigrants and Jajangmyeon
 The Beginning of Jajangmyeon
 Gonghwachun Guest Room of the 1930s
 The Jajangmyeon Boom Period
 Jajangmyeon, an Iconic Symbol of Today
 Gonghwachun Kitchen in the 1960s

Transportation
The museum is accessible within walking distance southeast of Incheon Station of Seoul Metropolitan Subway.

See also
 List of museums in South Korea

References

External links

  

2012 establishments in South Korea
Museums established in 2012
Museums in Incheon